The Royal Danish Geographical Society (RDGS) is a scientific society aimed at furthering the knowledge of the Earth and its inhabitants and to disseminate interest in the science of geography.

It was founded 18 November 1876 on the initiative of Professor E. D. Erslev. The society is based in Copenhagen, Denmark.

The society awards the Hans Egede Medal in silver 'preferably for geographical studies and researches in the Arctic countries'. It was established in 1916 and named after Hans Egede, who was a Danish missionary in Greenland.

External links
 Royal Danish Geographical Society website 

Geographic societies
Scientific organizations based in Denmark
Organizations based in Copenhagen
Scientific organizations established in 1876
1876 establishments in Denmark